"Get Over You" and "Move This Mountain" are two songs by British pop singer Sophie Ellis-Bextor. In most countries, "Get Over You" was released as the sole single, but in the United Kingdom, the two tracks were released as a double A-side single on 10 June 2002. The former track was taken off the Read My Lips album reissue, while the latter was an album track in the original album release.

The double A-side was Ellis-Bextor's third (and most recent) top-three hit in the United Kingdom, peaking at number three on the UK Singles Chart. "Get Over You" by itself reached the top 10 in Denmark, Spain, Australia, and New Zealand. In the latter two countries, the song was certified platinum and gold, respectively. In Europe, the track peaked within the top 20 in Finland, the Netherlands, Norway, and Switzerland.

Music video

"Get Over You"
The video for "Get Over You" is set in a shopping mall, after hours, on a rainy night. The camera passes by the closed, neon-lit stores, and locks onto the shopwindow of "Parisienne Bridalwear" where a designer is adjusting the garments of waxy-looking mannequins of bride and groom. The bride dummy, played by Sophie Ellis-Bextor, suddenly starts to blink and roll its eyes. The designer finally decides to move the groom, played by Swedish recording artist Jonas Myrin, away from Bextor and places it beside the other bride-doll. The Bextor-dummy starts to sing and performs clumsy movements of its various body parts, tilting and turning its head, trying axial hand-rotation, but all these remain unnoticed by the designer, who leaves the scene. Bextor's motion becomes gradually smoother, as the doll keeps singing and is getting more and more alive. She even drops her bouquet, and acquires a kind of power that makes her capable of breaking the store window without even touching it. Engulfed in a shower of exploding glass splinters, Bextor steps out of the window, removes her bridal costume, revealing a pink frock, and starts walking down the shopping lane. Other female mannequins in fashion shops come alive as she passes by and blasts the windows open. The liberated dolls all escape and follow Bextor in a robotic dance. The video finishes with Bextor waving to the camera with both hands and shattering the screen into fragments.

"Move This Mountain"
The music video for "Move This Mountain" is composed entirely of mirrored scenes, first in black and white, and then in color. It was directed by Sophie Muller. Both videos were included in Ellis-Bextor's video album, Watch My Lips.

Track listings

UK CD1
 "Get Over You"
 "Move This Mountain"
 "Live It Up" 
 "Get Over You" 

UK CD2
 "Get Over You"
 "Get Over You" 
 "Move This Mountain" 

UK cassette single
 "Get Over You"
 "Move This Mountain"
 "Everything Falls into Place" 

European CD single
 "Get Over You"
 "Move This Mountain"

Australasian CD single
 "Get Over You" 
 "Move This Mountain" 
 "Live It Up" 
 "Get Over You" 
 "Murder on the Dancefloor" 
 "Get Over You" 
 "Move This Mountain"

Credits and personnel
Credits are lifted from the Read My Lips album booklet.

"Get Over You"
Studios
 Produced and arranged at Murlyn Studios (Stockholm, Sweden)
 Mixed at Khabang Studio (Stockholm, Sweden)
 Mastered at Sony Music Studios (London, England)

Personnel
 Sophie Ellis-Bextor – writing
 Rob Davies – writing
 Korpi & Blackcell – production, recording, arrangement
 Henrik Korpi – writing, keyboards, programming
 Mathias Johansson – writing, guitar, bass, keyboards, programming
 Nina Woodford – writing, background vocals
 Emma Holmgren – background vocals
 Niklas Flyckt – mixing
 Göran Elmquist – mix assistant
 John Davis – mastering

"Move This Mountain"
Studios
 Recorded at Mayfair Studios (London, England)
 Mixed at Townhouse Studios (London, England)
 Mastered at Sony Music Studios (London, England)

Personnel
 Sophie Ellis-Bextor – writing
 Ben Hillier – writing, all instruments, piano, programming, production
 Alex James – writing, bass, production
 Darren Nash – recoding assistant
 Jeremy Wheatley – mixing
 John Davis – mastering

Charts
All entries charted as "Get Over You" except where noted.

Weekly charts

Year-end charts

Certifications

Release history

References

2001 songs
2002 singles
Music videos directed by Sophie Muller
Polydor Records singles
Song recordings produced by Korpi & Blackcell
Songs written by Sophie Ellis-Bextor
Sophie Ellis-Bextor songs
Songs written by Henrik Korpi
Songs written by Mathias Johansson (producer)
Songs written by Rob Davis (musician)
Songs written by Nina Woodford

it:Move This Mountain